Yeshwant Club Ground is a cricket ground located at the Yeshwant Club in Indore, Madhya Pradesh, India.

The stadium hosted 35 first-class matches  from 1935 when Central India cricket team played against Australian cricket team in a tour match. until 1960. Since then the ground has hosted non-first-class matches.

See also 
 Yeshwant Club
 Daly College Ground
 Holkar Stadium
 Indore State
 Holkar

References

External links
Cricinfo profile
Cricketarchive.com
Wikimapia

Sports venues in Madhya Pradesh
Sports venues in Indore
Sport in Indore
Cricket grounds in Madhya Pradesh
Multi-purpose stadiums in India
1935 establishments in India
Sports venues completed in 1935
20th-century architecture in India